Bogovarovo is a rural locality (a selo) and the administrative center of Oktyabrsky District, Kostroma Oblast, Russia. Population:

References

Notes

Sources

External links

Rural localities in Kostroma Oblast
Oktyabrsky District, Kostroma Oblast